The Gamm Theatre (previously The Sandra Feinstein-Gamm Theatre) is a non-profit theater in Warwick, Rhode Island.

History
The theater was founded in October 1984 as Alias Stage by seven members of the graduating class of Trinity Rep Conservatory.  They performed at the Riverside Mills in Providence's Olneyville neighborhood, but that space was destroyed by a fire on December 18, 1989. Alias reopened at the Atlantic Mills with a production of "The Dragon" on January 18, 1990, immediately adjacent to the Riverside Mills. The group moved to a semi-permanent garage space in the Providence Jewelry District in 1994, backed by a board of directors.

In 1998, the theater staged its last performance as the Alias Stage with King Lear. They then changed their name to the Sandra Feinstein-Gamm Theatre after receiving a donation of $100,000 from Alan Shawn Feinstein in memory of his sister. The theater remained in the cramped Jewelry District until October 2002, when they were in need of a larger space and financial re-organization. The Gamm announced a hiatus following a production of Cat on a Hot Tin Roof. Shortly after, they hired Tony Estrella as Artistic Director and Yvonne Seggerman as managing director, and the Gamm reopened in November 2003 with a 135-seat house in an old police garage, part of the Pawtucket Armory Center.

Their 34th season, in 2018–2019, was the first full season after relocating from Pawtucket to their new, permanent home on Jefferson Boulevard in Warwick at the old Ocean State Theatre building. A renovation is underway while they still produce their 35th season in 2019–2020, using elements of the original building fused with newer elements and technology to upgrade the theatre.

Awards

Elliot Norton Awards
2008– Outstanding New Script (Paul Grellong, Radio Free Emerson)
2009– Outstanding Production by a Small Company (Awake and Sing!)
2010– Special Citation for having "firmly established itself as a theatrical jewel in our region" celebrating its 25th season

Pell Award for Excellence in the Arts
2013– Artistic Director Tony Estrella

Seasons

2019–20 Season
Admissions (Joshua Harmon)
JQA (Aaron Posner)
A Doll's House, Part 2 (Lucas Hnath)
Assassins (music and lyrics by Stephen Sondheim. Book by John Weidman)
Mary Jane (Amy Herzog)
It's A Wonderful Life: a Live Radio Play (adapted by Joe Landry)

2017–18 Season
The Importance of Being Earnest (Oscar Wilde) dir. Fred Sullivan, Jr.
Incognito (Nick Payne) dir. Tyler Dobrowsky
The SantaLand Diaries (Joe Mantello, adapted for the stage from the story by David Sedaris)
Uncle Vanya (Anton Checkov) Translated and Directed by Curt Columbus
A Human Being Died That Night (Nicholas Wright, adapted for the stage from the book by Pulma Gobodo-Madikizela) dir. Judith Swift
As You Like It (William Shakespeare) dir. Tony Estrella and Rachel Walshe

2016–17 Season
Arcadia (Tom Stoppard) dir. Fred Sullivan, Jr.
American Buffalo (play) (David Mamet) dir. Tyler Dobrowsky
The Children's Hour (Lillian Hellman) dir. Rachel Walshe
The Nether (Jennifer Haley) dir. Judith Swift
King Elizabeth (Freely adapted from Mary Stuart (play) by Friedrich Schiller) Adapted and Directed by Tony Estrella

2015–16 Season
A Streetcar Named Desire (Tennessee Williams) dir. Tony Estrella
The Rant (Andrew Case) dir. Tyler Dobrowski
Grizzly Mama (George Brandt) dir. Rachel Walshe
A Skull in Connemara (Martin McDonagh) dir. Judith Swift
A Winter's Tale (William Shakespeare) dir. Fred Sullivan, Jr.

30th Anniversary Season (2014–15)
Grounded (George Brant) dir. Judith Swift
Hedda Gabler (Henrik Ibsen) adpt. and dir. Tony Estrella
Morality Play (Tony Estrella, adapted for the stage from the novel by Barry Unsworth, World Premiere) dir. Tyler Dobrowski
The House of Blue Leaves (John Guare) dir. Fred Sullivan, Jr.
Marie Antoinette (David Adjmi) dir. Rachel Walshe

2013–14 Season
A Number/Far Away (Caryl Churchill) dir. Judith Swift/Tony Estrella
Good People (David Lindsay-Abaire) dir. Rachel Walshe
The Big Meal (Dan LeFranc) dir. Tyler Dobrowski
Macbeth (William Shakespeare) dir. Fred Sullivan, Jr.
Blackbird (David Harrower) dir. Tony Estrella

2012–13 Season
After the Revolution (Amy Herzog) dir. Tony Estrella
Red (play) (John Logan) dir. Tony Estrella
Anne Boleyn (Howard Brenton, US Premiere) dir. Rachel Walshe
The Real Thing (Tom Stoppard) dir. Fred Sullivan, Jr.
The Beauty Queen of Leenane (Martin McDonagh) dir. Judith Swift

2011–12 Season
Circle Mirror Transformation (Annie Baker) dir. Rachel Walshe
Hamlet (William Shakespeare) dir. Fred Sullivan, Jr.
Festen (David Eldridge, based on the Dogme film and screenplay by Thomas Vinterberg, Mogens Rukov and Bo hr. Hansenir) dir. Tony Estrella
Boom (Peter Sinn Nachtrieb) dir. Fred Sullivan, Jr.
1984 (George Orwell, adapted by Nick Lane) dir. Tony Estrella

2010–11 Season
Glengarry Glen Ross (David Mamet) dir. Fred Sullivan, Jr.
Mauritius (Theresa Rebeck) dir. Rachel Walshe
A Child's Christmas in Wales (Dylan Thomas) adpt. and dir. Tony Estrella
A Doll's House (Henrik Ibsen, adapted by Tony Estrella) dir. Fred Sullivan, Jr.
Paul (Howard Brenton, US Premiere) dir. Tony Estrella
Why Torture is Wrong, and the People Who Love Them (Christopher Durang) dir. Tony Estrella

25th anniversary season (2009–10)
Much Ado About Nothing (William Shakespeare) dir. Fred Sullivan, Jr.
Romeo and Juliet (William Shakespeare) dir. Tony Estrella
The SantaLand Diaries by David Sedaris, adapted by Joe Mantello
4:48 Psychosis (Sarah Kane) dir. Tony Estrella
The Glass Menagerie (Tennessee Williams) dir. Fred Sullivan, Jr.
Rock 'n' Roll (Tom Stoppard) dir. Judith Swift

2008–09 SeasonDon Carlos (Friedrich Schiller adapted by Tony Estrella) dir. Tony EstrellaAn Ideal Husband (Oscar Wilde) dir. Judith SwiftAwake and Sing! (Clifford Odets) dir. Fred Sullivan, Jr.Grace (Mick Gordon & A.C. Grayling) dir. Tony EstrellaThe Scarlet Letter (Phyllis Nagy adapted from the novel by Nathaniel Hawthorne) dir. Judith Swift

2007–08 SeasonThe Elephant Man (Bernard Pomerance) dir. Tony EstrellaNixon's Nixon (Russell Lees) dir. Judith SwiftThe Pillowman (Martin McDonagh) dir. Peter SampieriBoston Marriage (David Mamet) dir. Judith SwiftThe Taming of the Shrew (William Shakespeare) dir. Peter Sampieri

2006–07 SeasonMother Courage and Her Children (Bertolt Brecht) dir. Tony EstrellaThe SantaLand Diaries and Season's Greetings (David Sedaris adapted by Joe Mantello) dir. Chris Byrnes and Wendy OverlyEnhanced Interrogation Techniques: A Hand Witch of the Second Stage (Peter Barnes) dir. Peter Sampieri, One for the Road, Press Conference (Harold Pinter), Catastrophe (Samuel Beckett) dir. Fred Sullivan, JrSin: A Cardinal Deposed (Michael Murphy) dir. Judith SwiftRadio Free Emerson (Paul Grellong) dir. Peter Sampieri

2005–06 SeasonCrime and Punishment (Adapted by Marilyn Campbell & Curt Columbus, from the novel by Fyodor Dostoyevsky) dir. Peter SampieriTwelfth Night (William Shakespeare) dir. Tony EstrellaThe Lonesome West (Martin McDonagh) dir. Judith SwiftTop Girls (Caryl Churchill) dir. Wendy OverlyLa Bête (David Hirson) dir. Fred Sullivan, Jr.

2004–05 SeasonAn Enemy of the People (Henrik Ibsen adapted by Arthur Miller) dir. Tony EstrellaThe Rise and Fall of Little Voice (Jim Cartwright) dir. Judith SwiftRed Noses (Peter Barnes) dir. Peter SampieriOleanna (David Mamet) dir. Judith SwiftThe Beard of Avon (Amy Freed) dir. Tony Estrella

2003–04 SeasonThe Crucible (Arthur Miller) dir. Fred Sullivan, Jr.A Child's Christmas in Wales (Dylan Thomas) dir. Tony EstrellaAunt Dan and Lemon (Wallace Shawn) dir. Tony EstrellaBarrymore (William Luce) dir. Fred Sullivan, Jr.Julius Caesar'' (William Shakespeare) dir. Judith Swift

References

External links
 The Sandra Feinstein-Gamm Theatre Website
 News coverage in Providence Journal

Theatres in Rhode Island
Buildings and structures in Pawtucket, Rhode Island
Tourist attractions in Pawtucket, Rhode Island
1984 establishments in the United States
Performing groups established in 1984